The American Journal of Community Psychology (AJCP) is a quarterly peer-reviewed academic journal covering community psychology. It was established in 1973 by Dr. Charles D. Spielberger, with notable previous editors including, Dr. Julian Rappaport, Edison Trickett (1993-1999), Bill Davidson (1999-2010), and Jacob Tebes (2010-2018). AJCP is currently published by Wiley (publisher). The current editor-in-chief as of 2018 iss Dr. Nicole E. Allen (University of Illinois at Urbana-Champaign).  Dr. Nicole Allen was the first woman to hold this position. In 2020, the journal had a two-year impact factor of 3.55. According to Clarivate's journal impact factor report, AJCP is consistently ranked as a top journal in the categories of Psychology, Multidisciplinary, Public, Environmental & Occupational Health, and Social Work. 

In addition to publishing original research, the journal publishes empirical reviews, policy statements, editorials and first-person accounts. 

The journal is the official publication of the Society for Community Research and Action, division 27 of the American Psychological Association.

References

External links

 American Journal of Community Psychology Website 
Psychology journals
Springer Science+Business Media academic journals
Publications established in 1973
Bimonthly journals
English-language journals
Psychotherapy journals